Kurt Adolff (5 November 1921 – 24 January 2012) was a racing driver from Germany.

Adolff was born in Stuttgart, Germany, into a family that owned a textile company, and served as a paratrooper during the Second World War. Adolff competed in Formula Two races in the early 1950s racing BMW-engined cars, achieving modest success including second place at a race at the Munich-Riem Airport. He later competed in a Ferrari 500 during 1953, and participated in the 1953 German Grand Prix, driving Rudi Fischer's Ferrari 500 for the Ecurie Espadon Team. He retired after only a few laps, and left single-seater racing to concentrate on his business interests. Adolff later enjoyed some success in hillclimbs and touring car racing with Jaguar, and also served as a consul to Chile.

Complete Formula One World Championship results
(key)

References

1921 births
2012 deaths
Écurie Espadon Formula One drivers
German Formula One drivers
German racing drivers
Sportspeople from Stuttgart
Racing drivers from Baden-Württemberg
Fallschirmjäger of World War II